Nola geminata is a moth in the family Nolidae. It was described by Paul Mabille in 1899. It is found on Madagascar.

References

geminata
Moths of Africa
Lepidoptera of Madagascar
Moths described in 1899